Summerhayesia is a genus of flowering plants from the orchid family, Orchidaceae. It has two known species, both native to tropical Africa.

Summerhayesia laurentii (De Wild.) P.J.Cribb - Ghana, Ivory Coast, Liberia, Gabon, Zaire
Summerhayesia zambesiaca P.J.Cribb - Zaire, Tanzania, Malawi, Zambia, Zimbabwe

See also 
 List of Orchidaceae genera

References

External links 

Orchids of Africa
Vandeae genera
Angraecinae